Joseph Fischer may refer to:

 Franz Joseph Emil Fischer (1877–1947), German chemist
 Joseph Anton Fischer (1814–1859), German artist
 Joseph Emanuel Fischer von Erlach (1693–1742), Austrian architect
 Joseph Fischer (cartographer) (1858–1944), German cartographer
 Joschka Fischer (Joseph Martin Fischer, born 1948), German politician
 Joseph Fischer (Kentucky politician) (born 1954), American politician and state legislator in Kentucky
 Josef E. Fischer (born 1937), American physician and professor
 Josef Fischer (cyclist) (1865–1953), German road racer
 Joseph Fischer (footballer) (1909–1986), Luxembourgian footballer
 Josef Fischer (footballer), Austrian
 Josef Fischer, Sr., Austrian cartwright and founder of the sporting-goods company Fischer
 Joey Fischer (1976–1993), murdered American student, see Murder of Joey Fischer

See also
 Joseph Fisher (disambiguation)